Sanjit Roy (born 6 November 1928) is an Indian former cricketer. He played three first-class matches for Bengal between 1950 and 1952.

See also
 List of Bengal cricketers

References

External links
 

1928 births
Living people
Indian cricketers
Bengal cricketers
Cricketers from Kolkata